Astroblepus ventralis is a species of catfish of the family Astroblepidae. It is found in Colombia, in the Dagua River and Pacific coast.

References

Bibliography
Eschmeyer, William N., ed. 1998. Catalog of Fishes. Special Publication of the Center for Biodiversity Research and Information, num. 1, vol. 1–3. California Academy of Sciences. San Francisco, California, United States. 2905. .

Astroblepus
Fish described in 1912
Freshwater fish of Colombia